Arnold Gibbons (born 19 October 1930) is a Guyanese cricketer and professor of communications. He played in two first-class matches for British Guiana in 1952/53 and 1953/54.

Gibbons was born in Triumph, Demerara. He was captain of the Queen's College cricket team before representing British Guiana.

Gibbons read philosophy at University College, London University. He holds graduate degrees from Syracuse and Cornell Universities. He was a professor of communications at Hunter College, New York, USA.

Works
 The legacy of Walter Rodney in Guyana and the Caribbean (2011) University Press of America.
 Race, politics & the white media : the Jesse Jackson campaigns (1993) University Press of America.
 Walter Rodney and His Times. (1994) Guyana National Printers Limited.

See also
 List of Guyanese representative cricketers

References

1930 births
Living people
Guyanese cricketers
Guyana cricketers